Długie may refer to:

Długie, Włocławek County in Kuyavian-Pomeranian Voivodeship (north-central Poland)
Długie, Rypin County in Kuyavian-Pomeranian Voivodeship (north-central Poland)
Długie, Podlaskie Voivodeship (north-east Poland)
Długie, Łódź East County in Łódź Voivodeship (central Poland)
Długie, Radomsko County in Łódź Voivodeship (central Poland)
Długie, Lublin County in Lublin Voivodeship (east Poland)
Długie, Tomaszów Lubelski County in Lublin Voivodeship (east Poland)
Długie, Krosno County in Subcarpathian Voivodeship (south-east Poland)
Długie, Sanok County in Subcarpathian Voivodeship (south-east Poland)
Długie, Ostrołęka County in Masovian Voivodeship (east-central Poland)
Długie, Przysucha County in Masovian Voivodeship (east-central Poland)
Długie, Greater Poland Voivodeship (west-central Poland)
Długie, Strzelce-Drezdenko County in Lubusz Voivodeship (west Poland)
Długie, Żagań County in Lubusz Voivodeship (west Poland)
Długie, Pomeranian Voivodeship (north Poland)
Długie, Warmian-Masurian Voivodeship (north Poland)
Długie, West Pomeranian Voivodeship (north-west Poland)